The Walden–Wallkill Rail Trail, also known as the Jesse McHugh Rail Trail, is a  rail trail between the village of Walden, New York and the neighboring hamlet of Wallkill. The two communities are located in Orange and Ulster counties, respectively, in upstate New York.

The trail, like the Wallkill Valley Rail Trail to the north, is part of the former Wallkill Valley Railroad's rail corridor. The land was purchased by the towns of Montgomery and Shawangunk in 1985 and converted to a public trail. The portion of the trail in Shawangunk was formally opened in 1993 and named after former town supervisor Jesse McHugh. Plans to pave the trail between Walden and Wallkill were discussed since 2001, and the route was finally paved between 2008 and 2009. The trail includes an unofficial, unimproved section to the north of Wallkill, and is bounded by NY 52 and NY 208.

History 

Stretching  from Montgomery to Kingston, the Wallkill Valley Railroad operated from 1866 until its last regular freight run on December 31, 1977. In the 1980s, Conrail, then the owner of the Wallkill Valley line, attempted to sell the former rail corridor. The towns of Montgomery and Shawangunk – in Orange and Ulster counties, respectively – purchased their sections of the rail line to allow "development of a commercial corridor [as well as] utility easements and access" to a local reservoir.

The purchases were completed in August and October 1985, respectively. In November of that year, the New York State Department of Correctional Services bought  of the former corridor in Shawangunk's hamlet of Wallkill, near the Wallkill Correctional Facility. This portion extends from Birch Road to the town line with Gardiner. The Shawangunk Correctional Facility was built at that location. South of Walden, the corridor remains an active rail line operated by the Norfolk Southern Railway.

North of the prisons, the former corridor continues as the separate Wallkill Valley Rail Trail. Rail trail enthusiasts have been trying to find a way to combine the two rail trails since the 1990s, and in 2004 the town of Shawangunk commissioned an open space study that identified possible ways to accomplish such a connection. A 2008 Ulster County transportation plan included projects to connect the trails, and the town of Shawangunk is currently considering plans to connect the trails by diverting the corridor along Birch Road. The original route of the corridor is  within the prisons' perimeter fence.

The portion of the former corridor running through the center of Wallkill was converted to a road, Railroad Avenue. The southern part of the route, running from Wallkill to the Montgomery–Shawangunk town line, was officially opened as the Jesse McHugh Rail Trail on June 5, 1993. Jesse McHugh was a former Shawangunk town supervisor. The northern portion of the Shawangunk section, which stretches to the border of the prison grounds, is maintained by the town but not officially part of the trail.

In 2001, Shawangunk, Montgomery and the Walden began applying for over $600,000 in TEA-21 grants to create a paved, Americans with Disabilities Act of 1990 (ADA)-accessible trail between Walden and Wallkill. The total cost of paving the trail was expected to be $750,000, though it eventually ballooned to $1.5 million. The decision to pave the trail was vehemently opposed by horseback riders who felt it would endanger them, and protested at several public meetings by the Mid-Hudson Horse Trails Association. The decision was also opposed by nearby homeowners who believed an increase in trail use would threaten their privacy.

In October 2003, Walden, Shawangunk and Montgomery acquired the $600,000 grant needed to begin paving the trail. Two months later, Bob and Doris Kimball, a couple in Montgomery, donated  of their land to create a park by the trail near Lake Osiris Road. The park is expected to be developed once funds are available to do so. Nearly $200,000 in funding to complete pavement of the trail was lost when the outgoing 109th Congress did not approve a 2006 budget bill. In February 2008, Congressman Maurice Hinchey announced the appropriation of $351,000 to complete the project. Construction began on September 22, 2008, and the paved  trail opened on May 2, 2009. Flooding from hurricanes in 2011 caused a cave-in along the Montgomery section of the trial. The storms eroded much of the ground beneath the trail, causing the ground to sink. , no repairs have been completed; the cost of fully repairing the trail was estimated to be $214,000.

Route 

The trail begins at the  Wooster Grove Park in the village of Walden, near NY 52. There is a visitor center for rail trail users at the park. The park also contains Walden's former train station, which has since been renovated as a recreational facility.

Once in Shawangunk, the trail passes by the Borden Estate, a mansion built in 1906 by the granddaughter of Gail Borden. In 1854, Gail Borden patented the process for creating condensed milk; the Borden family subsequently owned a series of milk companies. The mansion is now used by the School of Practical Philosophy for philosophy classes.

About  from the town line, the trail reaches its Wallkill trailhead bordering NY 208, directly across the street from the Shawangunk police station. The paved section between Walden and Wallkill is flat, with only a 3% grade. A portion of the former corridor in central Wallkill has since been converted to a road.

An unimproved northern section in Wallkill extends  from the intersection of Railroad Avenue and C. E. Penny Drive to Birch Road. Birch Road marks the border between the former corridor and two state prisons. This section passes through private hunting grounds and is "unmarked and has no signs" but is "arguably ... the most scenic" portion of the former Wallkill Valley rail corridor, featuring "splendid" views of the Shawangunk Ridge to the west.

The trail is used for walking, jogging, bicycling and dog walking.

See also 

 Wallkill Valley Rail Trail – the northern continuation of the former rail corridor

References

Bibliography

External links 

 Route of the trail

Videos:
 
 
 
 

Parks in Orange County, New York
Parks in Ulster County, New York
Wallkill Valley Railroad